Svavar Markússon (born 30 May 1935) is an Icelandic middle-distance runner. He competed in the men's 800 metres at the 1960 Summer Olympics.

References

1935 births
Living people
Athletes (track and field) at the 1960 Summer Olympics
Svavar Markusson
Svavar Markusson
Place of birth missing (living people)